Michael O'Gorman (August 16, 1965 – September 2018) was an American coxswain who won 3 world championship medals.  He was born in Massachusetts, grew up in Florida, and was then educated at the University of Pennsylvania.  He coxed the US lightweight eight at the World Rowing Championships from 1987 to 1992, winning bronze in 1987, silver in 1988, and bronze again in 1991.  He subsequently became a coach, including at Vesper Boat Club, Stetson University, and the Chicago Rowing Center.

References

External links

 (note name mis-spelled)

1965 births
2018 deaths
American male rowers
World Rowing Championships medalists for the United States
Place of death missing
Coxswains (rowing)
Date of death missing
Sportspeople from Massachusetts